South Carolina Highway 62 (SC 62) was a state highway that existed in the central part of Charleston County.

Route description
SC 62 began at an intersection with U.S. Route 17 (US 17)  in Red Top. It traveled to the northeast on Bees Ferry Road and ended at SC 61 north of Johns Island, near Drayton Hall.

History
SC 62 was established in 1923. It was decommissioned in 1936. Its path now is part of US 17 and the entirety of Bees Ferry Road.

Major intersections

See also

References

External links
Former SC 62 at the Virginia Highways South Carolina Annex

062 (1920s–1930s)
Transportation in Charleston County, South Carolina